Ek Se Badhkar Ek may refer to:

Ek Se Badhkar Ek (1976 film)
Ek Se Badhkar Ek (2004 film)
Ek Se Badhkar Ek (TV series), a 2008 Indian music and dancing competition television series that aired on Zee TV
Ek Se Badhkar Ek (1995 TV series), a 1995 Indian television show